is a station on the Tama Toshi Monorail Line in Tachikawa, Tokyo, Japan.

Lines

Station layout
Tachikawa-Kita Station is a raised station with two tracks and two opposed side platforms, with the station building located underneath.

Platforms

History
Tachikawa-Kita station opened on 27 November 1998. It was the southern terminus until the extension south to Tama-Center was opened in January 2000.

Station numbering was introduced in February 2018 with Tachikawa-Kita being assigned TT12.

Surrounding area
The station is just north of JR Tachikawa Station. Both stations (and Tachikawa-Minami Station) are connected via a pedestrian walkway. Other points of interest include:

 Showa Memorial Park

See also
 List of railway stations in Japan

References

External links

 Tama Monorail Tachikawa-Kita Station 

Railway stations in Japan opened in 1998
Railway stations in Tokyo
Tama Toshi Monorail
Tachikawa, Tokyo